Fissurina is a genus of unilocular (single chambered) calcareous forams, similar in general form to Lagena, but included in the nodosariacean family Ellipsolagenidae, Lagenida.

The test is rounded to ovate in outline, oval to lenticular in section, and may have  one or more peripheral keels. Wall calcareous, hyaline, finely perforate, surface smooth, with random or regularly aligned punctae. Aerture terminal, ovate to slitlike, within a slightly depressed fissure at the test apex, provided internally with an entosolenian tube that may be central or may curve toward one side of the test and may be attached to the inner wall. Stratigraphic range: Cretaceous to Holocene.

References 

 A.R. Loeblich and H. Tappan, 1964. Sarcodina Chiefly "Thecamoebians" and Foraminiferida; Treatise on Invertebrate Paleontology, Part C Protista 2. Geological Society of America and University of Kansas Press.
 A.R. Loeblich and H. Tappan,1988. Forminiferal Genera and their Classification. (E-book)

Foraminifera genera
Extant Cretaceous first appearances